RCC1 and BTB domain-containing protein 1 is a protein that in humans is encoded by the RCBTB1 gene.

This gene encodes a protein with an N-terminal RCC1 domain and a C-terminal BTB (broad complex, tramtrack and bric-a-brac) domain. In rats, over-expression of this gene in vascular smooth muscle cells induced cellular hypertrophy. The C-terminus of RCBTB1 interacts with the angiotensin II receptor-1A. In humans, this gene maps to a region of chromosome 13q that is frequently deleted in B-cell chronic lymphocytic leukemia and other lymphoid malignancies.

References

Further reading